Hurricane (stylized as HURRICANE) is the eighteenth single released by the Japanese hip-hop group Lead. It was their first single of 2011, released a year after their previous single Speed Star. The peaked at #8 on the Oricon charts, where it stayed for three weeks. The single became their first single to chart in the top ten on Oricon since their 2006 single Virgin Blue.

The single was released in five formats, a standard CD, and four CD only editions that corresponded to each member. The four corresponding versions were also release as limited editions, which contained event tickets. Each member edition contained different b-sides on the CD portion, along with differing cover art.

Information
Hurricane is the eighteenth single released by the Japanese hip-hop group Lead. It was their first single of 2011, release on August 10, a year after their previous single Speed Star. This would be the final annual single released by the group, whereas they would begin to release multiple singles per year the following year. The single charted well on the Oricon Singles Charts, taking the #8 spot for the week and remaining on the charts for three consecutive weeks. The single became their first single to chart in the top ten on Oricon since their 2006 single Virgin Blue. 

The single was released in five editions, a standard CD and four member editions that corresponded to each member of the group, each harboring different content and cover art. Not only did the cover art differ with each member edition, when all four editions were purchased, the back covers formed a complete image. The member editions would also be released as first press limited editions that came with special event tickets to the group's nationwide tour Lead Upturn 2011～Sun×You～.

The song "Unbalance na Kiss wo Shite", which was available on the type A edition, was a cover of the song of the same name, originally released by Hiro Takahashi in 1994 for his second album, Welcome to Popsicle Channel.
  
The standard edition harbored the title track, the coupling tracks "Can't Stop" (stylized as CAN'T STOP) - which was available on every edition - and 24HRS, and the songs' corresponding instrumentals. Jacket A, which corresponded with lead vocalist Hiroki, contained the title track, the coupling tracks "Can't Stop" and "Unbalance na Kiss wo Shite" (アンバランスなKISSをして / Unbalanced Kiss), and the corresponding instrumentals to "Hurricane" and "Unbalance na Kiss wo Shite". Jacket B, which corresponded with lead rapper Shinya, contained the title track, the coupling tracks "Can't Stop" and "Sun×You", and corresponding instrumentals to "Hurricane" and "Sun×You". Jacket C, corresponding with Keita, featured the title track, the coupling tracks "Can't Stop" and "walk", and the instrumentals to "Hurricane" and "walk". Jacket D, which corresponded with the youngest member, Akira, held the title track, the two b-sides "Can't Stop" and the live mix of their song "What cha gonna?", which was originally on their studio album Brand New Era (2004), and the instrumentals for the title track and live mix.

Track listing

Charts (Japan)

References

External links
Lead Official Site

2011 singles
2011 songs
Japanese-language songs
Pony Canyon singles
Lead (band) songs